Chris or Christopher Gilbert may refer to:

 Chris Gilbert (cricketer) (born 1984), English cricketer
 Chris Gilbert (American football) (born 1946), American football player
 Chris Payne Gilbert, American actor
 Chris Gilbert (soccer) on All-time New Hampshire Phantoms roster
 Christopher Gilbert, poet
 Christopher Gallard Gilbert, furniture historian and museum curator